Amphimallon verticale is a species of beetle in the Melolonthinae subfamily that can be found in Croatia and Greece.

References

Beetles described in 1855
verticale
Beetles of Europe